Bendigo is a city in Victoria, Australia.

Bendigo may also refer to:

Places
 City of Greater Bendigo, a local government area in Victoria, Australia
 Division of Bendigo, Australian electoral division in Victoria, Australia
 Bendigo Creek, Australia
 Bendigo, New Zealand, a settlement and historic area
 Bendigo (suburb), suburb of Bendigo

Other uses
 William Abednego "Bendigo" Thompson (1811–1880), English bare-knuckle boxer and namesake of the town
 Bendigo (horse), a thoroughbred racehorse
 HMAS Bendigo, two ships of the Royal Australian Navy

See also
 Greater Bendigo National Park, in Victoria, Australia
 Bendigo Box-Ironbark Region, a tract of land in Victoria, Australia